Hare is a surname. Notable people with the surname include:

Politicians
 Butler B. Hare (1875-1967), South Carolina politician
 Darius D. Hare (1843-1897), member of the US House of Representative from Ohio
 Jack Hare, Canadian politician
 James Butler Hare (1918–1966), U.S. Congressman from South Carolina
 John Hare, 1st Viscount Blakenham (1911-1982), British politician
 Nicholas Hare, Speaker of the House of Commons between 1539-1540
 Phil Hare (born 1949), American politician in Illinois
 Silas Hare (1827- 1907), US representative from Texas
 Thomas Hare (MP) (1686–1760) Member of Parliament for Truro (UK Parliament constituency)
 William D. Hare (1834-1910), American politician from Oregon
 William G. Hare, American politician from Oregon
William Hare, 1st Earl of Listowel (1751–1837), Irish peer and Member of Parliament
William Hare, 2nd Earl of Listowel (1801–1856), grandson of the 1st Earl, peer and Member of Parliament
William Hare, 3rd Earl of Listowel (1833–1924), son of the 2nd Earl, Baron Hare, Liberal politician 
 William Francis Hare, 5th Earl of Listowel (1906-1997), British politician

Athletes
 Albert Hare (1887-1969), British athlete 
 Anne Hare, (born 1964), New Zealand athlete
 Cecil Hare, (1919-1963), American football player
 Charlie Hare (1871-1934), English soccer player
 Cliff Hare, American football player
 Darren Hare, English soccer player and coach
 Dusty Hare (born 1952), English Rugby Union footballer
 Frode Håre, Norwegian ski jumper
Pip Hare, British yachtswoman
 Ray Hare (1917-1975) America footballer
 Remon van de Hare, Dutch basketball player
 Steriker Hare (1900-1977), English cricketer
 Truxtun Hare early US decathlete and Olympic medalist

Artists
 David Hare (artist) (1917-1992), U.S. sculptor and photographer
 Jimmy Hare (1856–1946), photographer for Colliers

Entertainers
 Doris Hare (1905-2000), Welsh actress
 Ernie Hare (1883-1939), American singer
 Ernest Hare (1900-?), English actor
 John Hare (1844-1921), English actor
 Katherine Hare, English theatre director
 Pat Hare (1930-1980), U.S. singer and guitarist
 Robertson Hare (1891-1979), English comedy actor
 Will Hare (1916-1997), American actor

Writers
 Augustus Hare (1834-1903), English writer
 Cyril Hare (1900-1958), English crime writer
 David Hare (dramatist) (born 1947), English dramatist
 Richard Mervyn Hare (1919–2002) English moral philosopher

Clergymen and theologians
 Augustus William Hare (1792-1834), English clergyman
 George Emlen Hare (1808-1892), American clergyman
 John Tyrrell Holmes Hare, Bishop of Bedford
 Julius Charles Hare (1795-1855), English theologian
 Richard Hare (bishop), Bishop of Pontefract
 William Hobart Hare (1838-1909), American clergyman

Academics and scientists
 Douglas R. A. Hare, American professor
 Jonathan Hare, British physicist
 Kenneth Hare (1919-2002), Canadian meteorologist
 Peter H. Hare (1935 - 2008), American philosopher
 Robert Hare (chemist) (1781–1858), chemist
 Robert D. Hare, Canadian criminal psychologist
 Tom Hare, professor and Japanologist

Soldiers
 Joseph Hare, U.S. Navy admiral
 Luther Hare (1851-1929) officer in the U.S. Cavalry
 Peter Hare (officer) (1748-1834), American soldier

Others
 Clayton Hare (1909-2001), Canadian teacher
 David Hare (philanthropist) (1775-1842), Scottish philanthropist
 Francis Hare, 6th Earl of Listowel
 Henry Hare (1861-1921), English architect
 John E. Hare (born 1949), U.S. moral philosopher
 Jon Hare (born 1966), British computer game designer
 Joseph C. Hare, American lumberman from Oregon
 Judith Hare, Countess of Listowel (1903-2003), British-Hungarian journalist
 Michael Hare, 2nd Viscount Blakenham (born 1938), British peer
 Nathan Hare, American educationalist
 R. M. Hare (1919-2002), British moral philosopher
 Sid J. Hare (1860-1938), American landscape architect
 Thomas Hare (political scientist), English barrister
 William Hare (murderer) (1792-1859), Irish serial killer

Surnames from nicknames